Kazimierz Sosnowski (1875–1954) was a Polish geographer.

1875 births
1954 deaths
Polish geographers